The Church of Inmaculada Concepción (Spanish: Iglesia Parroquial de la Inmaculada Concepción) is a church located in Navalcarnero, Spain. It was declared Bien de Interés Cultural in 1983.

References 

Inmaculada Concepcion
Bien de Interés Cultural landmarks in the Community of Madrid